The lay apostolate is made up of laypersons, who are neither consecrated religious nor in Holy Orders, who exercise a ministry within the Catholic Church. Lay apostolate organizations operate under the general oversight of pastors and bishops, but need not be dependent upon them for direction.

The laity can exercise a fruitful apostolate by their conduct in the areas of their labor, profession, studies, neighborhood, and social life. And according to the Vatican II Decree on the Apostolate of the Laity, they will look for opportunities to announce Christ to their neighbors through the spoken word as well (AA 13).

From Vatican II to Pope Francis 

The Second Vatican Council of bishops in the Catholic Church has been seen as elevating the laity “from passive spectators to involved members”. It was the first council in church history to specifically address the place of the laity in the life of the church. Before the Council, the laity were purely passive spectators at Mass (in Latin) and this passivity also characterized their approach to the apostolate. Exceptions were charitable organizations like St. Vincent de Paul Societies and the Knights of Columbus. But the task of teaching the faith was entrusted almost entirely to priests and religious sisters.

Pope Paul VI established the Pontifical Council for the Laity in the period after Vatican II. Since the Council lay Catholics have exercised leadership in many apostolates, such as organizing charitable works and advocacy groups on behalf of the poor and oppressed. With a declining number of priests and sisters, lay persons have also undertaken the responsibility for religious education and fill more and more administrative positions at Catholic schools. The Council also specified that parents are the primary religious educators of their children. And It taught that “the secular employment of laypeople, far from being a distraction from their Christian vocation, was their primary way to sanctify, not only themselves but society.”

In 2013, Francis Cardinal Arinze explained that lay persons "...are called by Baptism to witness to Christ in the secular sphere of life; that is in the family, in work and leisure, in science and cultural, in politics and government, in trade and mass media, and in national and international relations." Arinze noted that there are many things individuals may accomplish for Christ quietly without belonging to a particular association. In other instances, organizations are more efficient to address challenges beyond the capacity of one person.

Pope Francis calls for missionary disciples 
Pope Francis has continually criticized clericalism and emphasized that all are "one, holy People of God". He emphasizes that the "hour of the laity" has arrived and decries clericalism as rife in the Church, saying that it "leads to the functionalization of the laity, treating them as 'messengers'."

In November 2019, Pope Francis addressed the new Dicastery for the Laity, Family, and Life during its first plenary assembly which had the topic, “The Lay Faithful, Identity and Mission in the World”. He urged them to use their talents as “missionary disciples” to address the various challenges of the whole Church and world, to be "visible signs" of the presence of Christ in every environment. He warned against “clericalizing the laity”: "Move the deacons away from the altar. …They are the custodians of service, not first-class altar boys or second-class priests.” In his first Apostolic Exhortation as Pope he had entitled a section "We are all missionary disciples" and he returned to the term seven times in that exhortation.  He has also pointed out that “In truth, the laity who have an authentic Christian formation do not have need of a 'bishop-pilot' or a 'monsignor-pilot', or of clerical input to assume their proper responsibilities, on all levels: from the political to the social, from the economic to the legislative!" He called rather for bishops to be encouraging toward lay apostolates, good shepherds.

See also 

 Apostolate
 Apostle (Christian)
 Associations of the faithful
 Catholic lay organisations
 Christian ministry, as age-specific ministry, creative and performing arts, community service and outreach.
 Lay ecclesial ministry
 Universal call to holiness
 Vocational Discernment in the Catholic Church

References

External links
 Pope Pius XII to the Lay Apostolate on October 5, 1957
Pope Paul VI Apostolicam Actuositatem Nov. 18, 1965

Catholic laity
Christian missions
Christian terminology